Does Anyone Ever Listen? is a young adult novel by Rosie Rushton, first published with this title in 2006 by Piccadilly Press. It is the fourth and last part of her Leehampton series. It was first published under the title Where Do We Go From Here? by Piccadilly Press in 1998 and was reissued as Does Anyone Round Here Ever Listen? by Puffin Books in 1999.

Plot summary 
Sumitha meets Seb, who is in a band called Paper Turkey. Although they both like each other, they do not officially date. Sumitha dances to Paper Turkey's music in Stomping Ground, but her father sees it and forbids her to see Seb again. Sumitha lies to her father in order to go to a music festival where Paper Turkey are playing in a competition, but the band is drunk and do not win. Sumitha's father wants to arrange a marriage for her, and his friend Sajjed comes to visit, along with his son Asim and wife Chhobi. Asim objects to having an arranged marriage, which gains him Sumitha's admiration.

Laura wants to break up with Jon because she has met Simon Stagg, but she does not know how to tell him. On New Year's Ever, she leaves her celebrations with Jon to see Simon, upsetting Jon who still loves her. Laura is hurt and upset to learn that Simon is gay, and she eventually gets back together with Jon.

Chelsea has difficulty writing a sociology essay about unemployment, but after her mother is fired she writes an excellent essay and decides to study harder in the future. Bex returns to Leehampton, because her brother, Ricky, is a victim of violence at school. Chelsea helps him.

Jemma is angry, because her dad wants to move to Scotland. She also argues with her father because he objects to her starring in a commercial. Jemma attends casting anyway, but walks out after she realises that the commercial suggests that only slim people are valuable.

Jon's dad wants to move to Cornwall, because he is tired of his work. Jon argues with him, and then feel guilty after his father has a heart attack, even though it happened while his father was jogging.

Characters 
Chelsea Gee - Laura's best friend. Her mother is an agony aunt for teenagers and she writes articles for The Echo (a local newspaper). Chelsea is very pretty. She discovers her talent for sociology.
Laura Turnbull - Chelsea's best friend. She's got red hair and green eyes. Laura wants to be a writer. She wants her parents to live together, and dislikes their new partners. She's in love with Simon for a while, but comes back to Jon.
Jemma Farrant - A new girl in Lee Hill. She can't make her mum stop calling her "petal". She goes out with Rob.
Sumitha Banerji - A girl from India. Her family comes from Kolkata in West Bengal district. Sumitha originally likes Seb, but after the music festival, she falls in love with Asim.
Jonathan "Jon" Joseph - A talented student of Lee Hill. He goes out with Laura. 
Ginny Gee - Chelsea's mum. She's an agony aunt for teenagers and journalist for The Echo, but was fired from the radio. 
Barry Gee - Chelsea's dad. He has his own restaurant called Gee Whizz. 
Ruth Turnbull - Laura's mum. She goes out with Melvyn. 
Claire Farrant - Jemma's mum. She is not ready for Jemma to grow up, dressing her daughter in jumpers with little bears and calling her "petal" in public.
Andrew Farrant - Jemma's dad. 
Chitrita Banerji - Sumitha's mum. She teaches English to women from India.
Rajiv Banerji - Sumitha's dad. 
Sandeep Banerji - Sumitha's little brother. 
Anona Joseph - Jon's mum. She studies art.
Henry Joseph - Jon's dad. He wanted him to study in Cambridge.
Melvyn McCrouch - Ruth Turnbull's partner.
Betsy – Peter Turnbull’s partner. 
Rob Antell - Jemma's boyfriend and Jon's best friend.
Bex Bayliss - Chelsea's new friend.
Seb - A boy from the local band Paper Turkey. Sumitha liked him, but everything changed after the music festival.
Asim - A boy, who was supposed to have arranged marriage with Sumitha. He told his parents that he won't continue this tradition, but he seems to like Sumitha.
Chhobi - Asim's mother.
Sajjed - Asim's father.
Simon Stagg - A boy from Jon's class. He is gay, but he wanted to act like a "normal" boy in front of his father, so he invited Laura to his house.

British young adult novels
1998 British novels
Novels by Rosie Rushton